Pukatawagan is a First Nations community about  north of The Pas in Manitoba. It is part of the Mathias Colomb First Nation. It can be reached by train from The Pas by a branch of the Keewatin Railway Company, a passenger service provided by Via Rail. An ice road is utilized after the lakes have frozen. The Pukatawagan Airport, located east of town, is used by Missinippi Airways.

The community's name has most often been heard in "The Pukatawagan Song" by its resident, musical artist Sidney Castel.

External links
Pukatawagan / Mathias Colomb Cree Nation
Wings over Kississing
Northern Connections (archived)
Bill Hillman's extensive memories and pictures of teaching in Puk

Unincorporated communities in Northern Region, Manitoba
Indian reserves in Manitoba
Hudson's Bay Company trading posts
Road-inaccessible communities of Canada